Francisco Javier Ramos y Albertos (30 March 1746 – 11 October 1817) was a Spanish painter, born in Madrid. He became court painter to Charles IV of Spain and director of painting at the Real Academia de Bellas Artes de San Fernando.

References

Bibliography
García Sánchez, Jorge «Las colecciones del Palacio de España (siglos XVII y XVIII)» en El Palacio de España en Roma. Coleccionismo y antigüedades clásicas, Digital CSIC, EEHAR, 2010, pp. 17–36.
Marqués de Lozoya, «Cartas dirigidas por D. José Nicolás de Azara al pintor de cámara D. Francisco Javier Ramos / Palabras preliminares de El Marqués de Lozoya», Academia, nº 8 (1959), pp. 13–27.

18th-century Spanish painters
18th-century Spanish male artists
19th-century Spanish painters
19th-century Spanish male artists
Artists from Madrid
1746 births
1817 deaths